For schools of similar names, see Valley School (disambiguation)

The Valley School is a co-educational private day school 20 km south of Bangalore city in India. The school was founded in 1978 by philosopher Jiddu Krishnamurti. The student population of the school is around 325 from classes 1 to 12 (ages 6 to 17).

Culture 
Interactions between teacher and student are informal and based on Jiddu Krishnamurti’s philosophy that "Learning cannot happen when there is fear"(handling fear is also a learning). Freedom with responsibility is emphasized from an early age, and rewards and punishments are kept to a minimum. Students are encouraged to direct their own learning.

Education and curriculum 
The lower school is run based on Jiddu Krishnamurti's philosophies, where teachers and students are given freedom and flexibility. At the lower schools, the students are encouraged to think and derive at answers through guidance and correction. Along with a standard curriculum of science and humanities, extra-curricular activities are encouraged. Tests and examinations are kept to a minimum where there are no official "annual exam" till Grade 9. When a student reaches Grade 9 it will be the first time the students writes an exam conducted by the school.

Higher classes follow a standard ICSE curriculum, where they appear for a nationwide public board examination at the end of class 10. Class 12 students appear for the ISC examinations conducted by the same board. The School has had a 100% Pass percentage in both 10th and 12th since the batch of 1999.

Campus 
The school is set on a  campus with a lake and two artificial ponds, dams, three ancient Banyan trees (over 100 years old), and lightly wooded rolling hills. Academic buildings are concentrated around the main school in the eastern section of the campus; the student dormitories, residential quarters, guesthouses and the old "Art Village" was located on the western side. The old Art Village was destroyed and taken by the Forest Department in the year 2008. The New "Art Village" is located and built around the school Amphitheater.

The school had three entrances initially, the first gate being the main entrance to the school building, the second gate gave access to the football field while the third gate gave access to the Study Centre and the residential houses, as well as the Art Village. A stylized Neem Tree – which rests the highest point on the land, is the logo of the school. The school is divided into three divisions- Junior School- classes 1–4, Middle school- classes 5–7, and senior school- classes 8–12.

Transportation and Housing 
Most students commute to school by bus. The buses are both privately owned and public BMTC contract buses. The school buses operate on routes in the city, picking up and dropping students off. Car pooling is encouraged. Boarding is optional and is available for classes 11 and higher. Student hostels are located on campus.

Flora and fauna 
The school is a spot for regular outings of the Birdwatchers' Field Club of Bangalore. About 250 species of birds have been recorded on campus and in adjoining areas. Other creatures seen are fifteen species of mammals including deer, wild boar and elephants, resident leopards, and twenty species of snakes, of which five are venomous. The students learn about the importance of nature and are taught to coexist with it.

Study Center
The campus houses the Study Center which offers a simple and austere way of living for seekers of truth. The library has books  and DVD collection of J. Krishnamurti’s talks and dialogues. One can spend time as one pleases, by reading books, watching DVDs, or sitting in quiet reflection. Sturctured retreats, gatherings, and education related seminars are held throughout the year. 

Jiddu Krishnamurti's 125 birth anniversary was celebrated with an exhibition curated by Miti Desai on March 16 and 17, 2020. Jiddu Krishnamurti's contemplations on life, death, education, fear were presented innovatively with installations utilising trees, staircases, rooms.

First Sunday Meeting
On the first Sunday of month(except during School's summer vacation), gathering of people interested in Krishnamurti is held in the school campus. The school arranges a bus to the city to pickup and drop participants. After a brief explanation of day's topic, attendees are divided into small groups, for discussion on the topic. The meeting ends with a lunch hosted by the School. Temporary book exhibition is held adjacent to the gathering for  people to purchase books, DVDs and other materials.

Sister schools 
India
 Bal-Anand
 Pathashaala KFI
 Rajghat Besant School
 Rishi Valley School
 Sahyadri School
 The School KFI

United Kingdom
 Brockwood Park

United States of America
 The Oak Grove School

See also 
 Jiddu Krishnamurti
 Jiddu Krishnamurti Schools
 Rishi Valley School
 Walden's Path, Hyderabad
 Vidyaranya High School
 List of schools in India

References

 The Valley School – Krishnamurti Foundation India

External links 

 
 Jiddu Krishnamurthy
 Krishnamurthy Foundation India

Private schools in Bangalore
Educational institutions established in 1978
Jiddu Krishnamurti schools
1978 establishments in Karnataka